Rosa Gore (born Minnie Lyons; September 15, 1866 - February 4, 1941) was an American film actress active in Hollywood primarily during the silent era. She appeared in at least 70 films over the course of her career. She got her start in vaudeville and was known for her work with her husband, actor Dan Crimmins.

Gore was born in New York City and died in Los Angeles, California.

Select filmography 

 Vagabond Lady (1935)
 The Hard Hombre (1931)
 Anybody Here Seen Kelly? (1928)
 The Prairie King (1927)
 The Royal American (1927)
 The Adorable Deceiver (1926)
 Lovey Mary (1926)
 Seven Chances (1925)
 Madonna of the Streets (1924)
 Captain January (1924)
 The Town Scandal (1923)
 The Mistress of Shenstone (1921)
 La La Lucille (1920)

References 

1866 births
1941 deaths
American silent film actresses
American film actresses
Vaudeville performers